Riachuelo (S22) was an  in the Brazilian Navy.

Design and construction

Riachuelo was ordered in 1972, separately from her two sister boats. The submarine, built by Vickers Shipbuilding and Engineering at their shipyard in Barrow, was laid down on 26 May 1973, and launched on 6 September 1975. She was commissioned into the Brazilian Navy in early 1977.

Operational history

Decommissioning and fate

Riachuelo was decommissioned in 1997. She is now displayed at the Navy Cultural Centre in Rio de Janeiro.

References

External links
 The Submarine Heritage Centre - Brazilian "O" Class

Oberon-class submarines of the Brazilian Navy
Ships built in Barrow-in-Furness
1975 ships
Museum ships in Brazil
Museums in Rio de Janeiro (city)